Tales of Us is the sixth studio album by English electronic music duo Goldfrapp, released on 6 September 2013 by Mute Records. In June 2013, the duo embarked on the Tales of Us Tour to promote the album.

Background and release
Goldfrapp began recording their sixth studio album in April 2011, recording in the English countryside, then mixing in London. A re-launch of the band's official website was synchronised with the announcement, which featured a video trailer directed by Lisa Gunning. The duo debuted songs from Tales of Us at the Manchester International Festival on 17 and 18 July 2013.

The track "Drew" premiered on 15 July 2013 on Lauren Laverne's BBC Radio 6 Music morning show. On the same day, the full Lisa Gunning-directed "Drew" music video was uploaded to the duo's website and to YouTube. "Thea" was released on 24 March 2014 as the first official single from the album.

On 20 January 2014, Goldfrapp announced a one-off screening of their thirty-minute film anthology Tales of Us, which was shown by Arts Alliance Media in select theatres across the UK, Europe, North America, Australia and New Zealand on the evening of 4 March. Co-created by Alison Goldfrapp and Gunning, the film follows five characters—Stranger, Laurel, Jo, Drew and Annabel—and spans themes of love, loss, madness and identity. The film was followed immediately by an exclusive live performance by Goldfrapp transmitted into cinemas from AIR Studios in London.

The song "Annabel" was inspired by Kathleen Winter's 2010 novel of the same name, about an intersex child being raised as a boy. Gunning, who directed the video for the song, optioned feature-film rights to the novel in 2014. "Clay" is based on a letter written by World War II veteran Brian Keith to his lover, another soldier known as "Dave".

Critical reception

Tales of Us received generally positive reviews from music critics. At Metacritic, which assigns a weighted mean rating out of 100 to reviews from mainstream critics, the album received an average score of 75, based on 26 reviews. AllMusic wrote that although "Tales of Us isn't as immediate as, say, Supernature", it is "Goldfrapp's most sophisticated work to date, and one of their most consistently satisfying albums." Jordan Mainzer of musicOMH viewed the album's aesthetic as "striking" and "noticeably starker than anything [Goldfrapp have] made before", concluding, "This is real music, about real people, dealing in real emotion. That it sounds so gorgeously lush too is mere icing on a very rich cake." Andy Gill of The Independent stated, "The delicate guitar and piano figures and the sombre languor of strings behind Alison Goldfrapp's breathy vocals create something akin to a cross between the dreamlike mythopoeism of old folk tales and the lush cinematic arrangements of Michel Legrand."

Mojo critic David Hutcheon opined that compared to Felt Mountain and Seventh Tree, "the mood [on Tales of Us] is all of a piece, the songs are stronger, and nobody suggests lightening the atmosphere with a high-energy single to reassure listeners that Alison hasn't taken leave of her senses." Slant Magazine's Blue Sullivan praised the vocals as "simultaneously gorgeous and terrifying" and dubbed the album "a vital change of pace for Alison Goldfrapp, who's made a brilliant career of being the siren of lost souls." Ryan Lathan of PopMatters noted that "Alison has rarely sounded this captivating and the album contains some of the loveliest vocal performances she's recorded thus far." Lathan continued, "Goldfrapp have seemingly rekindled their creative fires and the result is a challenging and devastatingly beautiful record."

Will Salmon of Clash called the album a "frequently beautiful return to form" and commented that "Tales Of Us is relentlessly one note but frequently beautiful, and a welcome change from the theatrics of its immediate predecessor, 2010's Head First" In a more mixed review, Pitchfork Media's Andrew Ryce felt that "some of the duo's unique imagination is replaced with a traditionalism that feels incongruous with the rest of their career", adding that "[d]iehard fans of Goldfrapp will no doubt find something to love here, but for the rest of us, it's a thin record that doesn't do much to prop up its skeletal frame." The Guardians Dave Simpson argued that "the tunes don't all carry the album's single pace. As a result, Tales of Us is slightly more mesmerising soundscape than collection of genuinely outstanding songs." Jeremy Allen of the NME was negative in his review, panning the album as "samey and indulgent". Consequence of Sound said that the album was Goldfrapp's "most intimate and lavish recording to date", and that it moved away from previous electronic/disco stylings to form "a complex mesh between trip-hop and lounge."

Commercial performance
Tales of Us debuted at number four on the UK Albums Chart with first-week sales of 13,817 copies, earning Goldfrapp their fourth consecutive top ten studio album. The album fell to number nineteen the following week, selling 4,484 units. Internationally, Tales of Us reached the top ten in Belgium, Germany and Switzerland, and the top twenty in Australia, Ireland, Netherlands, Norway and Portugal.

Track listing

Box set also contains:
 Vinyl album pressed on 180gm vinyl in a gatefold sleeve with 24" poster
 40-page, large-format hardback book compiled by Alison with exclusive images from Tales of Us
 12" lithographic art print
 Numbered certificate of authenticity

Personnel
Credits adapted from the liner notes of Tales of Us.

Goldfrapp
 Alison Goldfrapp – vocals, instruments
 Will Gregory – string arrangements, instruments

Additional musicians

 Steve Evans – additional programming ; acoustic guitar 
 Aidan Love – additional programming 
 Nick Ingman – string scoring, string conducting
 Charlie Jones – double bass 
 Alex Lee – bass guitar ; acoustic guitar ; electric guitar, Nashville guitar 
 Martyn Barker – drums 
 John Parish – drums 
 John Parricelli – guitar 
 Ian Burdge – cello 
 John Metcalfe – viola 
 Louisa Fuller – violin 
 Martyn Barker – Indian guitar ; drums 
 Paul Cowgill – horse effects 
 Ross Hughes – acoustic guitar, cavaquinho 
 Chris Laurence – double bass 
 String section 
 Everton Nelson, Steve Morris, Emlyn Singleton, Warren Zielinski, Rita Manning, Richard George, Ian Humphries, Patrick Kiernan, Ann Morfee, Debbie Widdup, Kathy Shave, Dave Williams, Rusty Pomeroy, Boguslaw Kostecki, Tom Pigott-Smith, Mark Berrow – violin
 Peter Lale, Bill Hawkes, Bruce White, Andy Parker, Nick Barr, Morgan Goff – viola
 Ian Burdge, Sophie Harris, Nick Cooper, Penny Driver, Chris Allan – cello
 Chris Laurence, Richard Pryce, Stacey Watton – double bass

Technical

 Alison Goldfrapp – production
 Will Gregory – production
 Greg Freeman – additional engineering 
 Eduardo de la Paz – additional engineering ; mixing assistance 
 Craig Silvey – mixing
 Gary Thomas – string recording
 John Dent – mastering

Artwork

 Alison Goldfrapp – artwork direction
 Mat Maitland – artwork direction
 Annemarieke van Drimmelen – photography
 Julie Rubio – image treatments
 Lenka Rayn H. – additional photography

Charts

Weekly charts

Year-end charts

Certifications

Release history

References

2013 albums
Goldfrapp albums
Mute Records albums